Txurdinaga is a station on line 3 of the Bilbao metro. The station is also served by Euskotren Trena commuter and regional rail services. The station is located in the neighborhood of Txurdinaga, part of the Otxarkoaga-Txurdinaga district of Bilbao. It opened on 8 April 2017.

Station layout 

Txurdinaga follows the same cavern-like station layout shared by most underground stations of the system, designed by Norman Foster, with the main hall located suspended directly above the tracks.

Access 

  30 Gabriel Aresti Av. (Gabriel Aresti exit)
  Gurena St. (Garaizar exit, closed during night time services)
   Gabriel Aresti /  Garai Gardens (Gabriel Aresti exit)

Services 
Unlike the two other lines of the Bilbao metro system (which are operated by Metro Bilbao S.A.), line 3 is operated by Euskotren, which runs it as part of the Euskotren Trena network. Trains from the Bilbao-San Sebastián, Txorierri and Urdaibai lines of the network run through line 3. The station is also served by two local Bilbobus lines.

Gallery

References

External links
 

Line 3 (Bilbao metro) stations
Euskotren Trena stations
Railway stations in Spain opened in 2017
Buildings and structures in Bilbao
2017 establishments in the Basque Country (autonomous community)